Knight Moves is a 1992 thriller film, directed by Carl Schenkel and written by Brad Mirman, about a chess grandmaster who is accused of several grisly murders.

Plot
In 1972 David and Peter face each other in a chess match. David, the loser, stabs the winner Peter with a fountain pen. The loser's savage attack on his childhood opponent after his public humiliation and defeat leads to the dissolution of his parents' marriage. His father leaves forever, and the boy finds his mother dying from suicide from a slashed wrist, yet he ignores her and retrieves his locked-away chessboard. The boy spends the next twenty years in and out of asylums and foster care and is never seen again.

In the meantime, Peter becomes one of the youngest, most successful chess grandmasters in history. A brilliant yet troubled widower with a beloved daughter, he suddenly finds himself a suspect in his casual lover's murder. When more homicides occur, newly-appointed Police Captain Frank Sedman and his partner Detective Andy Wagner determine that a serial killer is at work. As the chess master becomes more and more connected to the deaths, psychologist Kathy Sheppard is brought in to figure out if the chess prodigy is as innocent as he claims to be.

Cast

 Christopher Lambert as Peter Sanderson
 Diane Lane as Kathy Sheppard
 Tom Skerritt as Captain Frank Sedman
 Daniel Baldwin as Detective Andy Wagner
 Katharine Isabelle  as Erica Sanderson
 Charles Bailey-Gates as David Willerman
 Blu Mankuma as Steve Nolan
 Ferdy Mayne  as Jeremy Edmonds 
 Elizabeth Baldwin as Christie Eastman
 Rachel Hayward as  Last Victim
 Megan Leitch as Mother
 Codie Lucas Wilbee as David at nine
 Don Thompson as Father
 Joshua Murray  as Peter at fourteen
 Alex Diakun as Grandmaster Lutz
 Arthur Brauss as Viktor Yurilivich
 Elizabeth Barclay as Loraine Olson
 Aundrea MacDonald as Mary Albert
 Sam Malkin as Doctor Fulton
 Kymberly Sheppard as Detective Janet McLellan
 Deryl Hayes as Officer Harton
 Kehli O'Byrne as Debi Rutlege
 Monica Marko as Miss Greenwell

Production

Filming took place on location in Victoria, British Columbia, Canada.  The exterior of the hotel is actually Hatley Castle which is part of the Hatley Park National Historic Site. The interiors were filmed in a German studio as well as the Tea Lobby of the Fairmont Empress Hotel in Victoria.

Lambert and Lane were married in real life during the production, having been married from 1988 to 1994.

Reception 
On Rotten Tomatoes the film has an approval rating of 17% based on reviews from six critics.

Box Office 
The film was a modest financial success in the United States, grossing $560,580 and finishing at 15th in its opening week, it had a total gross of $853,554. In Germany, the film had almost two million viewers. It became Carl Schenkel's most commercially successful movie.

References

External links

 
 

1990s serial killer films
1992 films
American psychological thriller films
1990s mystery thriller films
1990s psychological thriller films
Films about chess
American mystery thriller films
American police detective films
Films shot in Vancouver
American serial killer films
Films with screenplays by Brad Mirman
Films scored by Anne Dudley
Films directed by Carl Schenkel
Republic Pictures films
InterStar Releasing films
Columbia Pictures films
CineVox films
1990s English-language films
1990s American films